The 2012 South American Artistic Gymnastics Championships were held in Rosario, Argentina, November 8–11, 2012. The competition was organized by the Santa Fe Gymnastics Federation and approved by the International Gymnastics Federation. This was the 11th edition of the South American Artistic Gymnastics Championships for senior gymnasts.

Participating nations

Medalists

Medal table

References

South American Artistic Gymnastics Championships
South American Gymnastics Championships
International gymnastics competitions hosted by Argentina
South American Artistic Gymnastics Championships
South American Artistic Gymnastics Championships